The 2007 Prince Edward Island general election was held on May 28, 2007.  It elected members of the Legislative Assembly of the province of Prince Edward Island, Canada. The incumbent Progressive Conservative government was defeated by the Liberal opposition after holding power for eleven years.

The newly formed Green Party captured 3.04% of the vote or 4.44% in ridings they contested, beating out the New Democratic Party for third place. The New Democrats fell to 1.96% or 3.43% in ridings contested. They captured 3.06% of the vote, or 3.48% in the 24 of the 27 ridings they contested in the 2003 election.

Results

|- style="background:#ccc;"
! rowspan="2" colspan="2" style="text-align:left;"|Party
! rowspan="2" style="text-align:left;"|Party leader
!rowspan="2"|Candidates
! colspan="4" style="text-align:center;"|Seats
! colspan="3" style="text-align:center;"|Popular vote
|- style="background:#ccc;"
| style="text-align:center;"|2003
| style="text-align:center;"|Dissol.
| style="text-align:center;"|2007
| style="text-align:center;"|Change
| style="text-align:center;"|#
| style="text-align:center;"|%
| style="text-align:center;"|Change

|align=left|Liberals
|align=left|Robert Ghiz
|align="right"|27
|align="right"|4
|align="right"|4
|align="right"|23
|align="right"|+19
|align="right"|43,205
|align="right"|52.93%
|align="right"|+10.27%

|align=left|Progressive Conservatives
|align=left|Pat Binns
|align="right"|27
|align="right"|23
|align="right"|23
|align="right"|4
|align="right"|-19
|align="right"|33,754
|align="right"|41.35%
|align="right"|-12.94%

|align=left|Sharon Labchuk
|align="right"|18
|align="right"|*
|align="right"|-
|align="right"|-
|align="right"|-
|align="right"|2,482
|align="right"|3.04%
|align="right"|*

|align=left|New Democrats
|align=left|Dean Constable
|align="right"|15
|align="right"|-
|align="right"|-
|align="right"|-
|align="right"|-
|align="right"|1,597
|align="right"|1.96%
|align="right"|-1.10%

| colspan="2" style="text-align:left;"|Independents and no affiliation
|align="right"|2
|align="right"|-
|align="right"|-
|align="right"|-
|align="right"|-
|align="right"|594
|align="right"|0.73%
|align="right"|+0.73%
|-
| style="text-align:left;" colspan="3"|Total
| style="text-align:right;"|89
| style="text-align:right;"|27
| style="text-align:right;"|27
| style="text-align:right;"|27
| style="text-align:right;"|-
| style="text-align:right;"|81,632
| style="text-align:right;"|100%
| style="text-align:right;"| 
|}

* Green Party of Prince Edward Island was not a registered political party at the time of the 2003 election.

Synopsis of results

* - renamed in 2007 redistribution

 = open seat
 = turnout is above provincial average
 = incumbent re-elected in same riding
 = previously incumbent in another riding
 = other incumbent renominated

Largest and smallest margins of victory

The five largest margins of victory were:
 Rustico-Emerald: Carolyn Bertram, Liberal, defeated David Blacquiere, PC, by 869 votes.
 Cornwall-Meadowbank: Ron MacKinley, Liberal, defeated Margaret Duffy, PC, by 853 votes.
 Charlottetown-Brighton: Robert Ghiz, Liberal, defeated John Abbott, PC, by 753 votes.
 O'Leary-Inverness: Robert Henderson, Liberal, defeated Eva Rodgerson, PC, by 678 votes.
 Summerside-Wilmot: Janice Sherry, Liberal, defeated Gerard McCardle, PC, by 582 votes.

The five smallest margins of victory were:
 Vernon River-Stratford: Alan McIsaac, Liberal, defeated Allan Fraser, PC, by 66 votes.
 Stratford-Kinlock:  Cynthia Dunsford, Liberal, defeated David McKenna, PC, by 81 votes.
 Alberton-Roseville: Pat Murphy, Liberal, defeated Cletus Dunn, PC, by 123 votes.
 Montague-Kilmuir: Jim Bagnall, PC, defeated Billy Cann, Liberal, by 134 votes.
 Souris-Elmira: Allan Campbell, Liberal, defeated Andy Mooney, PC, by 210 votes.

Results by place

Results by region

Timeline
April 10, 2007 - Treasurer Mitch Murphy unveils the provincial budget. Many people referred to this budget as an "election budget", as it had promises for everyone.
April 17, 2007 - Canadian Broadcasting Corporation (CBC) news article declares Wikipedia the new PEI election battleground, with edits to the Pat Binns article that some say are partisan in nature.
April 26, 2007 - The ban on canned carbonated beverages was lifted. Canned beverages such as beer will be available by the summer, while soda will be available by January 1, 2008. This is thought to be a way to "grab votes" according to Sharon Labchuk and Dean Constable.
April 30, 2007 - Premier Pat Binns calls the election at his constituency's Progressive Conservative nominating convention.
May 1, 2007 - The Liberal Party release a series of political attack ads which many call "United States-style". One advertisement ran during Tuesday night's broadcast of American Idol on CTV. This type of advertising isn't normally seen in Island elections.
May 11, 2007 - All four party leaders talk rural health care and doctor recruitment.
May 15, 2007 - The first of a string of leaders debates was held. The leaders from all four parties attended.
May 28, 2007 - Liberals win a majority of seats, in the PEI Legislature. Taking 23 of 27, while the Progressive Conservatives drop to 4 seats. The New Democrats and the Greens win none.
June 12, 2007 - Liberal government of Robert Ghiz is sworn in, following resignation of the Pat Binns government.
August 30, 2007 - Pat Binns named ambassador to the Republic of Ireland and steps down as leader of the opposition, and as leader of the Progressive Conservative Party of Prince Edward Island.
September 4, 2007 - Olive Crane named interim leader of the Progressive Conservative Party of Prince Edward Island and made leader of the opposition.

Riding by riding results

Cardigan

|-
| style="background:whitesmoke;"|Belfast-Murray River
||
|Pat Binns
1,527 (55.15%)
|
|Charlie McGeoghegan
1,130 (40.81%)
|
|Ahmon Katz
112 (4.04%)
|
|
|
| 
||
|Pat Binns
|-
| style="background:whitesmoke;"|Georgetown-St. Peters
||
|Michael Currie
1,678 (53.08%)
|
|Danny Walker
1,389 (43.94%)
|
|
|
|Jane Dunphy
94 (2.97%)
|
| 
||
|Michael Currie
|-
| style="background:whitesmoke;"|Montague-Kilmuir
||
|Jim Bagnall
1,447 (52.43%)
|
|Billy Cann
1,313 (47.57%)
|
| 
|
| 
|
| 
||
|Jim Bagnall
|-
| style="background:whitesmoke;"|Morell-Mermaid
||
|Olive Crane
1,384 (46.46%)
|
|Doug Deacon
941 (31.59%)
|
| 
|
|Mike Avery
94 (3.16%)
|
|Larry McGuire (Ind.)
560 (18.80%)
||
|Olive Crane
|-
| style="background:whitesmoke;"|Souris-Elmira
|
|Andy Mooney
1,212 (42.90%)
||
|Allan Campbell
1,422 (50.34%)
|
|Rachel Leslie
70 (2.48%)
|
|Betty Fay
121 (4.28%)
|
| 
||
|Andy Mooney
|-
| style="background:whitesmoke;"|Stratford-Kinlock
|
|David McKenna
1,601 (45.94%)
||
|Cynthia Dunsford
1,682 (48.26%)
|
|Mark Wellman
129 (3.70%)
|
|Jane McNeil
73 (2.09)
|
| 
||
|David McKenna
|-
| style="background:whitesmoke;"|Vernon River-Stratford
|
|Allan Fraser
1,321 (45.74%)
||
|Alan McIsaac
1,387 (48.03%)
|
|Gary Clauseheide
100 (3.46%)
|
|Edith Perry
80 (2.77%)
|
| 
||
|Wilbur MacDonald†
|}

Malpeque

|-
| style="background:whitesmoke;"|Borden-Kinkora
|
|Fred McCardle
1,351 (39.11%)
||
|George Webster
1,811 (52.43%)
|
|Jamie Larkin
292 (8.45%)
|
| 
|
| 
||
|Fred McCardle
|-
| style="background:whitesmoke;"|Cornwall-Meadowbank
|
|Margaret Duffy
908 (32.13%)
||
|Ron MacKinley
1,761 (62.31%)
|
|Paul Ness
78 (2.76%)
|
|Kirk Brown
79 (2.80%)
|
| 
||
|Ron MacKinley
|-
| style="background:whitesmoke;"|Kellys Cross-Cumberland
|
|Steven Stead
1,246 (35.78%)
||
|Valerie Docherty
1,811 (52.01%)
|
|Peter Bevan-Baker
221 (6.84%)
|
|Lorraine Begley
171 (5.37%)
|
| 
||
|Carolyn Bertram
|-
| style="background:whitesmoke;"|Kensington-Malpeque
|
|Mitch Murphy
1,574 (44.29%)
||
|Wes Sheridan
1,788 (50.31%)
|
|Jodie Bowmaster
192 (5.40%)
|
|
|
|
||
|Mitch Murphy
|-
| style="background:whitesmoke;"|Rustico-Emerald
|
|David Blacquiere
1,101 (33.69%)
||
|Carolyn Bertram
1,970 (60.28%)
|
|Sharon Labchuk
197 (6.03%)
|
| 
|
| 
||
|Beth MacKenzie†
|-
| style="background:whitesmoke;"|York-Oyster Bed
|
|Jamie Ballem
1,401 (39.38%)
||
|Robert Vessey
1,970 (55.37%)
|
|Joan Cullen
126 (3.54%)
|
|James Rodd
61 (1.71%)
|
| 
||
|Jamie Ballem
|}

Charlottetown

|-
| style="background:whitesmoke;"|Charlottetown-Brighton
|
|John Abbott
916 (33.07%)
||
|Robert Ghiz
1,669 (60.25%)
|
|Cindy Burton
185 (6.68%)
|
| 
|
| 
|| 
|Robert Ghiz
|-
| style="background:whitesmoke;"|Charlottetown-Lewis Point
|
|Wes MacAleer
1,299 (41.06%)
||
|Kathleen Casey
1,865 (58.94%)
|
| 
|
| 
|
| 
|| 
|Wes MacAleer
|-
| style="background:whitesmoke;"|Charlottetown-Parkdale
|
|Mike Molyneaux
1,101 (37.95%)
||
|Doug Currie
1,666 (57.43%)
|
| 
|
|Zain Esseghaier
134 (4.62%)
|
| 
|| 
|Elmer MacFadyen †
|-
| style="background:whitesmoke;"|Charlottetown-Sherwood
|
|Chester Gillan
1,245 (39.84%)
||
|Robert Mitchell
1,712 (54.78%)
|
|Kat Murphy
83 (2.66%)
|
|Brian Pollard
85 (2.72%)
|
| 
|| 
|Chester Gillan
|-
| style="background:whitesmoke;"|Charlottetown-Victoria Park
|
|Jason Lee
958 (33.41%)
||
|Richard Brown
1,536 (53.58%)
|
|Denise Reiser
166 (5.79%)
|
|Dean Constable
207 (7.22%)
|
| 
|| 
|Richard Brown
|-
| style="background:whitesmoke;"|Tracadie-Hillsborough Park
|
|Elmer MacFadyen
1,102 (38.71%)
||
|Buck Watts
1,577 (55.39%)
|
|Robert Pendergast
95 (3.34%)
|
|Peter MacFarlane
73 (2.56%)
|
| 
||
|Mildred Dover†
|-
| style="background:whitesmoke;"|West Royalty-Springvale
|
|Wayne Collins
1,306 (40.72%)
||
|Bush Dumville
1,766 (55.07%)
|
|Larry Cosgrave
135 (4.21%)
|
| 
|
| 
||
|Wayne Collins
|}

Egmont

|-
| style="background:whitesmoke;"|Alberton-Roseville
|
|Cletus Dunn
1,364 (45.39%)
||
|Pat Murphy
1,487 (49.84%)
|
|Gerald O'Meara
95 (3.16%)
|
|Jillian Kilfoil
59 (1.96%)
|
| 
|| 
|Cletus Dunn
|-
| style="background:whitesmoke;"|Evangeline-Miscouche
|
|Wilfred Arsenault
935 (39.80%)
||
|Sonny Gallant
1,311 (55.81%)
|
|Mannie Gallant
103 (4.38%)
|
| 
|
| 
|| 
|Wilfred Arsenault
|-
| style="background:whitesmoke;"|O'Leary-Inverness
|
|Eva Rodgerson
1,055 (37.87%)
||
|Robert Henderson
1,731 (62.13%)
|
| 
|
| 
|
| 
|| 
|Eva Rodgerson
|-
| style="background:whitesmoke;"|Summerside-St. Eleanors
|
|Brent Gallant
1,228 (39.33%)
||
|Gerard Greenan
1,697 (54.36%)
|
|Stuart Smith
86 (2.75%)
|
|Paulette Halupa
77 (2.47%)
|
|John W. A. Curtis (Ind.)
34 (1.09%)
|| 
|Helen MacDonald†
|-
| style="background:whitesmoke;"|Summerside-Wilmot
|
|Gerard McCardle
1,063 (36.90%)
||
|Janice Sherry
1,645 (57.10%)
|
| 
|
|Ryan Pollard
173 (6.00%)
|
| 
|| 
|Greg Deighan†
|-
| style="background:whitesmoke;"|Tignish-Palmer Road
|
|Gail Shea
1,276 (44.85%)
||
|Neil LeClair
1,569 (55.15%)
|
| 
|
| 
|
| 
|| 
|Gail Shea
|-
| style="background:whitesmoke;"|Tyne Valley-Linkletter
|
|Philip Brown
1,155 (41.94%)
||
|Paula Biggar
1,599 (58.06%)
|
| 
|
|
|
| 
|| 
|Philip Brown
|}

References

Further reading

External links
CBC- PEI Votes 2007
Elections PEI
Election Almanac - Prince Edward Island Provincial Election

Elections in Prince Edward Island
2007 elections in Canada
2007 in Prince Edward Island
May 2007 events in Canada